is a former Japanese football player.

Playing career
Kajii was born in Kagoshima Prefecture on July 11, 1963. After graduating from Osaka University of Commerce, he joined the Japan Soccer League club Matsushita Electric (later Gamba Osaka) in 1986. He played as a regular player and the club won the championship in the 1990 Emperor's Cup. In 1992, the Japan Soccer League was re-organized as the J1 League. However, Kajii played in only the 1992 J.League Cup.  He retired at the end of the 1992 season, just before league competition started in 1993.

Club statistics

References

External links

1963 births
Living people
Osaka University of Commerce alumni
Association football people from Kagoshima Prefecture
Japanese footballers
Japan Soccer League players
J1 League players
Gamba Osaka players
Association football defenders